The 1991 FINA Swimming World Cup was the third of the series. It took place at seven short course venues in Europe and North America in March and April 1991. Seventeen swim styles were included for men and women.

Meets
Dates and locations for the 1991 World Cup meets were:

Event winners

50 freestyle

100 freestyle

200 freestyle

400 freestyle

1500/800 freestyle

50 Backstroke

100 Backstroke

200 Backstroke

50 Breaststroke

100 Breaststroke

200 Breaststroke

50 Butterfly

100 Butterfly

200 Butterfly

100 Individual Medley

200 Individual Medley

400 Individual Medley

References

 https://www.fina.org/sites/default/files/fswc-goldenbook2015_v2b.pdf

FINA Swimming World Cup
1991 in swimming